Douglas Charles Holyday (born 1942) is a retired Canadian politician who served as the last mayor of Etobicoke from 1994 to 1998 and the deputy mayor of Toronto from 2010 to 2013. Holyday was first elected to Etobicoke City Council as an alderman in 1982. After his term as mayor, he was elected to Toronto City Council, where he served until 2013, when he was elected as a member of Provincial Parliament (MPP).

Political career
An insurance broker by profession, Holyday was first elected to Etobicoke City Council as an alderman in 1982. He was defeated in his bid for the Etobicoke Board of Control in the 1985 municipal election but returned as an Etobicoke city councillor, representing Ward 6, from, 1988 until 1994 when he was elected Mayor. He also served as a member of the Metropolitan Toronto Council from 1994 until 1997.

He was the last mayor of the former city of Etobicoke, defeating incumbent Bruce Sinclair in the 1994 municipal election. After a garbage strike in 1995, Holyday and Etobicoke council tendered the garbage collection contract, and inviting CUPE and private operations to bid. Holyday noted that "[CUPE's] price was nowhere near what the private sector offered us", and noted that the contractor did the job with 35 employees as opposed to the previous 71. The move saved Etobicoke $1 million annual at the time, with city officials estimating it at $2 million in 2009, plus private contractors had to post a performance bond and commit to a wage rate for the duration of a five-year contract, which protected the city from a strike. In 1996, Etobicoke also bought out its employees' accumulated sick plan, with new employees not eligible for sick day accumulation.

Etobicoke was the only area in Toronto not affected by the 2009 garbage strike, with the sick day accumulation plan being one of the unresolved issues between the city and CUPE. Holyday also pointed out that 90 per cent of Canadian municipalities contract out garbage collection, with Oshawa being the only GTA municipality where garbage pickup is done by the city.

Etobicoke was amalgamated into Toronto with the 1997 election. With the position of Mayor of Etobicoke abolished, Holyday ran and was elected to the new Toronto City Council representing Ward 4 (Markland Centennial). With redistribution, Holyday was elected to the new Ward 3 in 1999 which he continued to represent until stepping down from council in 2013

One of Toronto council's staunchest conservatives, he is noted for his fiscal conservatism and tendency to oppose public spending measures. For example, in 2008 Holyday proposed that taxpayers' money could be saved if Toronto city councillors reduced their office expenses, kept better track of business mileage, adopted more frugal newsletters, stopped  donating to community groups and sports teams in their wards, and had to justify restaurant meals.  In addition to his fiscal conservatism, Holyday has also supported conservative policies in other fields. For example, he opposed banning gun clubs in Toronto, as well as a decision by council to ban the Toronto Sportsmen’s Show from the CNE (council later reversed its decision).  He has proposed removing the homeless from Nathan Phillips Square, and was the only member of council not to vote for a resolution describing homelessness as a national disaster. He once criticized plans to close certain streets in downtown Toronto for a "car-free day", saying that that would have a negative impact on businesses. Holyday also supported reducing the number of councillors, and voted against childcare subsidies. In 2012, Holyday proposed that casino lobbyists be banned from city hall, stating "I think the fairest way to do it is to take that part out of the equation".

Voters gave Holyday a clear majority in the 2003, 2006, and 2010 municipal elections, and no serious opponents came forward to challenge him.

Provincial politics
In 1987, Holyday ran for the Legislative Assembly of Ontario as a Progressive Conservative candidate in the 1987 provincial election, but lost to Liberal Linda LeBourdais by over 6,000 votes. He was asked to run for the Tories in the 2003 provincial election, but declined.

In July 2013, Holyday again ran as a Progressive Conservative candidate in the August 1, 2013 by-election to replace retiring Liberal Laurel Broten in the riding of Etobicoke—Lakeshore. Although he once argued that councillors who run for higher office should immediately resign from council, he instead elected to take a leave of absence without pay. On election day, he won by a 1,600-vote margin over the Ontario Liberal Party's candidate, fellow councillor Peter Milczyn.

On September 10, 2013 PC Leader Tim Hudak named Holyday as Tory Accountability critic.

He was defeated by Peter Milczyn in the Ontario general election of 2014.

Personal life
Holyday has lived his entire life in Etobicoke, and was an insurance broker before entering political life.
Doug Holyday Received the Key to the City of Toronto on 20 August 2013 from Mayor Rob Ford.

Election results

|align="left" colspan=2|Progressive Conservative gain from Liberal
|align="right"|Swing
|align="right"| -13.23
|

References

External links

1942 births
Living people
Mayors of Etobicoke
Metropolitan Toronto councillors
Progressive Conservative Party of Ontario MPPs
Toronto city councillors
21st-century Canadian politicians